Super Drags is a Brazilian adult animated comedy streaming television series created by Anderson Mahanski, Fernando Mendonça and Paulo Lescaut for Netflix.

Produced by Combo Estúdio, the series follows the adventures of Donizete, Patrick, and Ralph, three friends working in a department store who are also drag queen superheroes: Scarlet Carmesim, Lemon Chiffon, and Safira Cyan, the Super Drags responsible for protecting the LGBT community. and they need to combat with the homophobic villain Lady Elza.

The series has an English dub featuring the voices of RuPaul's Drag Race contestants Trixie Mattel, Ginger Minj, Willam, and Shangela.

Cancellation
Five episodes were released on November 9, 2018. The following month, Netflix cancelled the series after one season.

Cast and characters

Episodes

Season 1 (2018)

Production

LGBTQ representation

A year after Castlevania began streaming, Super Drags was added to Netflix. The show focuses on Donizete, Patrick, and Ralph, three gay friends working in a department store, who are also drag queen superheroes, named Scarlet Carmesim, Lemon Chiffon, and Safira Cyan are the Super Drags, and are responsible for protecting the LGBTQ community. On December 30, 2020, Donnie Lopez published an article on Black Girl Nerds, lamenting the lack of an "animated gay Latino male superhero being the lead of his own show," saying that while there has been an increase in the number of "LGBT+ folks being presented on family animated superhero shows," this has mainly focused on lesbian and bisexual characters, without "gay male Latino/Hispanic superhero animated leads." Lopez added that maintaining, popularizing, and creating gay characters can start to assuage harmful attitudes, noting that shows seldom "give gay male POC characters the title roles" in children's animation, leading them to perpetrate the idea that "gay male characters cannot be standalone titular characters." Even so, he gives the example of Aqualad in Season Three of Young Justice who is a bisexual Black man, while qualifying this by saying that Aqualad is "not the principal character of the show" and noting that while Super Drags did make gay men the protagonists, it "reinforced negative stereotypes" and hoped that the "lack of gay representation" in these animations could be remedies in the future.

Marketing and release
The first trailer was released on October 19, 2018. A Halloween special short video entitled "Gag! Gross, but I love it" ("Credo Que Delícia", in the original version) was released on October 31, 2018 on the series' official Facebook page. The music video "Highlight", performed by Pabllo Vittar, which features main characters of the series, was released on November 7, 2018.  The first season, consisting of five episodes, was officially released on November 9, 2018.

Reception 
Decider gave the show a positive review while noting that "We can’t deny we were hoping the humor here would be sharper." Charles Puilliam-Moore of Io9 praised the show for its political commentary and condemnation of homophobia, while criticizing some of the raunchier aspects of its humor as a weak part of the show. S.E. Fleenor wrote a positive review for SyFy Wire, calling it "an outrageous, adults-only, gay romp filled with sardonic condemnations of the rampant erasure and destruction of queer people told through harrowing exploits, hypersexual superpowers, and hilariously floppy cartoon bulges."

Controversy
Before its release, the series was the subject of controversy. In July 2018, the Brazilian Society of Pediatrics issued an official statement, claiming that the series could be harmful for children. However, Netflix has stated that the series is only meant for adult audiences, subsequently releasing a red-band trailer with a TV-MA rating displayed throughout. Also, another video was released, where Champagne, one of the series' characters, warns viewers that even though the series is animated, it contains adult content and is only for people over the age of 16.

References

External links
 
 

2010s Brazilian adult animated television series
2010s LGBT-related comedy television series
2018 Brazilian television series debuts
2018 Brazilian television series endings
Animation controversies in television
Brazilian adult animated action television series
Brazilian adult animated comedy television series
Brazilian adult animated superhero television series
Brazilian flash animated television series
Brazilian LGBT-related television shows
Drag (clothing) television shows
LGBT-related animated series
LGBT-related controversies in animation
LGBT-related controversies in television
Animated television series by Netflix
Portuguese-language Netflix original programming
Obscenity controversies in animation
Obscenity controversies in television
Rating controversies in television
Superhero comedy television series
Television controversies in Brazil
LGBT-related superhero television shows